The Metropolitan Borough of Wandsworth was a Metropolitan borough under the London County Council, from 1900 to 1965.

History
The borough was formed from five civil parishes: Clapham, Putney, Streatham, Tooting Graveney and Wandsworth. In 1904 these five were combined into a single civil parish called Wandsworth Borough, which was conterminous with the metropolitan borough. Before 1900 these parishes, and Battersea until 1888, had been administered by the Wandsworth District Board of Works.

Coat of arms
The coat of arms were granted on 6 July 1901. The blue wavy division represents the Rivers Wandle and Thames. French Huguenot refugees arrived in the area in 1685, and the blue drops represent the tears of their struggle. The five stars represent the constituent former parishes. At the top is a long boat, with a dragon's head, commemorating 9th century Danish incursions along the river. The borough council's motto was We Serve.

Population and area
The borough covered , which made it the largest in the County of London. The population recorded in the Census was:

Constituent parishes 1801–1899

Metropolitan Borough 1900–1961

Politics

The borough was divided into nine wards for elections: Balham, Clapham North, Clapham South, Fairfield, Putney, Southfield, Springfield, Streatham and Tooting.

Borough council

Parliament constituency
For elections to Parliament, the borough was divided into one and a half constituencies:
Clapham
Wandsworth
In 1918 the borough's representation was increased to five seats:
Balham and Tooting
Clapham
Putney
Streatham
Wandsworth Central
In 1950 the borough's representation was reduced to four seats:
Clapham
Putney
Streatham
Wandsworth Central

Replacement
When the metropolitan boroughs were replaced with larger London boroughs in 1965, this borough was split. The core area of Wandsworth (about ) became part of the London Borough of Wandsworth, along with the former Metropolitan Borough of Battersea, but the areas of Streatham and Clapham (totalling ) became part of the London Borough of Lambeth.

References

Further reading

External links
Vision of Britain

Metropolitan boroughs of the County of London
History of the London Borough of Lambeth
History of the London Borough of Wandsworth
1900 establishments in the United Kingdom
1965 disestablishments in the United Kingdom
Districts abolished by the London Government Act 1963